Krzysztof Ciuksza (born 29 November 1997) is a Polish Paralympic athlete who competes in mainly sprinting events. He is a double World silver medalist and a double European champion and has participated at the 2016 Summer Paralympics where he narrowly missed out on a bronze medal in the men's 400m T36.

References

1997 births
Living people
Sportspeople from Gorzów Wielkopolski
Paralympic athletes of Poland
Polish male sprinters
Athletes (track and field) at the 2016 Summer Paralympics
Medalists at the World Para Athletics Championships
Medalists at the World Para Athletics European Championships
Athletes (track and field) at the 2020 Summer Paralympics